The first Internationale Walter Benjamin Gesellschaft  (generally translated as "community" or "society"), here understood as "commune", was a founding within the 68er-Bewegung in Hamburg, at the time when the American Counterculture reached Europe's students.

Formation
Founded by Natias Neutert in 1968 and supported by Hubert Fichte and other cultural patrons, the institute worked until the end of 1973.

Goals
The institute sought to intensify the knowledge of Walter Benjamin's works. One important goal of the society was to propagate and promote Benjamin to a global prototype of theory of revolutionary change such as Marx. Another important goal was to combine Benjamin's elitist insights with the mass phenomenon of Pop music.

Re-Establishment
A globally orientated discourse has been launched by a new International Walter Benjamin Society in Berlin in 2000. It wishes to bring together "scientists and interested readers from all over the world" and organizes "large conferences every two years to Walter Benjamin, and related topics"

See also
 Walter Benjamin

External links
 International Walter Benjamin Society (current)

Notes 

Counterculture
Walter Benjamin
Cultural organisations based in Germany
Political advocacy groups in Germany